Endless Frontier may refer to:
 Science, The Endless Frontier, a 1945 report by Vannevar Bush to the President of the United States
 Endless Frontier: Vannevar Bush, Engineer of the American Century
  U.S. Innovation and Competition Act. formerly known as the Endless Frontier Act
 Super Robot Taisen OG Saga: Endless Frontier